Tingvollfjorden is a small fishing lake in the municipality of Ål in Viken county, Norway. The lake is located in the valley of Hallingdal, northwest of Honefoss on the watershed of the Hallingdalselva.

References

See also
List of lakes in Norway

Lakes of Viken (county)